The 2011 World Financial Group Continental Cup of Curling was held January 13–16 at the Servus Credit Union Place in St. Albert, Alberta.

It was the 7th Continental Cup, the first since December 2008. No event was held in 2009 due to the 2009 Canadian Olympic Curling Trials.

The event once again featured North America vs. the World. The North American team featured the Olympic silver medal-winning Cheryl Bernard rink, the Olympic gold medal-winning Kevin Martin rink, the current World champion rink of Kevin Koe, current Canadian champion Jennifer Jones, and Erika Brown and Pete Fenson, the current American champion rinks. The World team was represented by 2009 European champion Niklas Edin, 2010 European bronze medalist Mirjam Ott, World champion Andrea Schöpp, European champion Thomas Ulsrud, Olympic bronze medalist Wang Bingyu and a composite rink featuring former world champion David Murdoch, Olympic bronze medalist Ralph Stöckli and teammate Simon Strübin as well as 2007 World silver medalist Andreas Lang.

The North American team dominated the event, winning it outright before the final day, the second time in the history of the event. The North American team also set a record for the most points won in the history of the cup, breaking the previous record of 290 points set by the North American team in 2007.

Teams

Events

January 13
Women's team competition
10:30 am ET

Mixed Doubles
3:30 pm

Men's team competition
9:30 pm

January 14
Women's team competition
10:30 am

Mixed doubles
3:30 pm

Men's team competition
9:30 pm

January 15
 'A' Skins'
11:00 am

Singles
4:00 pm

The Kevin Martin rink tied with the record for the most points (at 27 points) in a singles match, set in 2002 by Kevin Martin. 

North America receives a bonus of 8 points for having the most aggregate points in the singles.

'B' Skins
9:30 pm

With John Morris' draw to the button, North America gained nine points and clinched the Continental Cup at 208 points.

January 16
Women's 'C' Skins
1:00 pm

Men's 'C' Skins
8:00 pm

The Kevin Martin rink wins CAD$13,000 for his win in the men's skins game.

References

External links
Official site

Continental Cup of Curling
Sport in St. Albert, Alberta
Continental Cup of Curling
Continental Cup of Curling
Continental Cup of Curling
Curling in Alberta